Mathis is an unincorporated community in Dallas County, in the U.S. state of Missouri.

History
A post office called Mathis was established in 1903, and closed in 1905. Tom Mathis, an early postmaster, gave the community his last name.

References

Unincorporated communities in Dallas County, Missouri
Unincorporated communities in Missouri